Herbert of Vermandois may refer to:

Counts of Vermandois
Herbert I, Count of Vermandois (c. 848/850–907), Count of Vermandois, lord of Senlis, of Peronne and of Saint Quentin, son of Pepin of Vermandois
Herbert II, Count of Vermandois (884–943), son of the above
Herbert III, Count of Vermandois (953–1015)
Herbert IV, Count of Vermandois (1028–1080)

Other
Herbert III, Count of Meaux (circa 950 – 995), member of the House of Vermandois